Newfoundland and Labrador Hydro (NL Hydro), commonly known as Hydro, is a provincial Crown corporation that generates and delivers electricity for Newfoundland and Labrador, as well as portions of Quebec and the north-eastern areas of the United States. Between 2007 ans 2021, NL Hydro is a subsidiary of the provincial Crown-owned energy holding company Nalcor Energy.

Newfoundland and Labrador Hydro's installed generating capacity,  (MW), is the fourth largest of all utility companies in Canada. Generating assets consist of 12 hydroelectric plants, including  the Churchill Falls hydroelectric plant, which is the second largest underground power station in the world, with a rated capacity of 5,428 MW of power, one oil-fired plant, four gas turbines and 26 diesel plants. Every year, Hydro generates and transmits over 80% of the electrical energy consumed by Newfoundlanders and Labradorians – over 6,487 GWh of energy in 2004. Hydro also distributes power directly to 35,000 customers in rural Newfoundland and Labrador.

In 1975, the Newfoundland and Labrador Power Commission, a crown corporation originally established to assist in rural electrification, was renamed Newfoundland and Labrador Hydro Corporation.

Newfoundland and Labrador Hydro is the parent company of the Hydro Group of Companies, which comprises
 Churchill Falls (Labrador) Corporation Limited (CFLCo)
 Lower Churchill Development Corporation Limited (LCDC)
 Gull Island Power Company Limited (GIPCo)
 Twin Falls Power Corporation Limited (TwinCo)

Grid operations, services and connections

Atlantic power connections 
The Nova Scotia government commissioned (from SNC-Lavalin) a study in 2009 to consider an Atlantic wide regional electricity market operator.

A $6.2 billion deal between Newfoundland and Labrador Hydro's parent company, Nalcor Energy and Halifax-based Emera was announced by premiers Darrell Dexter and Danny Williams on November 18, 2010. Nalcor Energy will spend $2.9 billion to build a power generating facility at Muskrat Falls, while Emera will invest $1.2-billion in the Maritime Transmission Link underwater power connection and $600 million in the Muskrat Falls facility in exchange for 20% of the 800-megawatts of capacity.

Generating facilities

Hydroelectric Generating Stations

Labrador (6,271 MW)
 Churchill Falls Generating Station, 5428 MW
 Muskrat Falls Generating Station, 824 MW
 Menihek Hydroelectric Generating Station, 19 MW
 Twin Falls Hydroelectric Generating Station, 225 MW (non-operating)
 Lower Churchill Generation Project, 2250  MW (in planning)
 Mary's Harbour, 240 kW

Newfoundland (1,254 MW)
 Bay d'Espoir Hydroelectric Generating Facility
 Cat Arm Hydroelectric Generating Station
 Granite Canal Hydroelectric Generating Station
 Hinds Lake Hydroelectric Generating Station
 Paradise River Hydroelectric Generating Station
 Upper Salmon Hydroelectric Generating Station
 Roddickton Hydroelectric generating station
 Snooks Arm Hydroelectric Generating Station
 Venams Bight Hydroelectric Generating Station
 Star Lake Hydroelectric Generating Station
 Exploits River (Grand Falls) Hydroelectric Generating Station
 Exploits River (Bishops Falls) Hydroelectric Generating Station

Non-Utility Generators
 Rattling Brook Hydroelectric Generating Station (Newfoundland Power)
 Deer Lake Hydroelectric Generating Station (Corner Brook Pulp and Paper)
 Corner Brook Stream Hydroelectric Generating Station (Corner Brook Pulp and Paper)

Thermal (Diesel) Generating Stations

Labrador (32.8 MW)
 Happy Valley-Goose Bay
 Mud Lake
 Black Tickle
 Cartwright
 Charlottetown
 Davis Inlet
 Hopedale
 L'Anse-au-Loup
 Makkovik
 Mary's Harbour
 Nain
 Norman's Bay
 Port Hope Simpson
 Postville
 Rigolet
 St. Lewis
 Williams Harbour

Newfoundland (23.5 MW)
 Francois
 Grey River
 Hawke's Bay
 Little Bay Islands
 McCallum
 Ramea (Wind Diesel)
 St. Anthony
 St. Brendan's

Thermal (Oil) Generating Stations

Newfoundland (490 MW)
 Holyrood Thermal Generating Station

Gas Turbine Generating Stations

Labrador (27 MW)
 Happy Valley-Goose Bay

Newfoundland (223.5 MW)
 Hardwoods 
 Holyrood  
 Stephenville

Solar Generating Stations
 Mary's Harbour, 190 kW

Highlights in the history of Newfoundland and Labrador Hydro
 1947 – George Desbarats hired as an engineering consultant to undertake a water power survey
 1949 – Premier J.R. Smallwood promised to create a public utility
 1954 – On June 22, the Power Commission Act was passed creating the Newfoundland Power Commission, what would become Newfoundland and Labrador Hydro
 1956 – George Desbarats began as Commissioner and sole employee of the Newfoundland Power Commission.
 1956 – British Newfoundland Development Corporation (BRINCO) was formed to explore development at Bay d'Espoir and later Churchill Falls
 1958 – Premier Smallwood announced his Rural Electrification Plan
 1958 – John Ryan succeeds George Desbarats as Chair of the Commission
 1961 – Frank Newbury becomes Chair of the Commission
 1963 – Government passed the Rural Electrification Act, which established power distribution districts (PDDs) to assist non-incorporated municipalities to access electricity where feasible
 1964 – George Hobbs becomes Chair
 1964 – Bay d'Espoir Hydro Electric Development begins
 1965 – Government signed an agreement with Newfoundland Light and Power to give it ownership of the rural lines connected to its system. Any future lines would be jointly constructed.
 1965 – The Newfoundland and Labrador Power Commission Act replaced the 1954 Power Commission Act and created the Newfoundland and Labrador Rural Electrical Authority (REA). The Act also provided for the establishment of a province-wide electrical code.
 1966 – Bay d'Espoir Stage 2 began construction
 1968 – Construction on Holyrood Thermal Generating Station began
 1969 – CFLCo and Hydro-Québec sign the Upper Churchill Falls power contract
 1971 – First power from Churchill Falls delivered to Quebec
 1974 – Churchill Falls project was complete.
 1974 – Wallace Read replaces George Hobbs as Chair of the Power Commission.
 1974 - Government acquires part ownership of CFLCo from Brinco
 1975 – Government reforms the Commission into the Newfoundland and Labrador Hydro-Electric Corporation (Hydro)
 1975 – Denis Groom appointed as president and CEO of Hydro
 1975 – Government appoints Douglas Fullerton as the first Chairman of the Board of the Hydro Group of Companies.
 1978 – Stage 3 of the Bay d'Espoir project was officially opened
 1978 – Victor Young replaced Denis Groom as chairman and CEO of Hydro
 1980 – Hinds Lake Hydro Electric Development came on stream
 1981 – Roddickton hydro generating station opened
 1983 – Upper Salmon Hydro Electric Development plant opened
 1985 – Cat Arm Hydro Electric Development opened making it the second largest hydro project on Newfoundland.
 1985 – Cyril Abery replaced Vic Young as chairman and CEO
 1989 – Paradise River Hydro Electric Development became operational
 1989 – Hydro Place became the official headquarters for the Hydro Group of Companies
 1991 – Cyril Abery resigned as chairman and CEO. He was replaced by David Mercer as president and CEO, while James Chalker assumed the duties of chairman of the board.
 1995 – William Wells replaced David Mercer as president and CEO of Hydro.
 1998 – Two private hydro projects at Star Lake and Rattle Brook were put into service
 2003 – New 40 MW Granite Canal Hydro Electric Development officially opened
 2019 - Jennifer Williams replaces Jim Hynes as President of Hydro

See also 
 Newfoundland Power
 Fortis Inc.

References

External links 
 Newfoundland and Labrador Hydro
 The loophole in the 1969 Hydro-Quebec/CFLCo. agreement

 
Electric power companies of Canada
Crown corporations of Newfoundland and Labrador
Hydroelectric power companies of Canada
Companies based in St. John's, Newfoundland and Labrador
Electric power transmission system operators in Canada
Canadian companies established in 1954
1954 establishments in Newfoundland and Labrador
Energy companies established in 1954